Zelquistinel (GATE-251, formerly AGN-241751) is an orally active small-molecule NMDA receptor modulator which is under development for the treatment of major depressive disorder (MDD) by Gate Neurosciences, and previously by Allergan.

Zelquistinel acts through a unique binding site on the NMDA receptor, independent of the glycine site, to modulate receptor activity and enhance NMDAR-mediated synaptic plasticity. Its mechanism of action is similar to that of rapastinel. However, unlike rapastinel, zelquistinel is orally bioavailable, exhibits increased potency, and has improved drug properties.

On July 23, 2018, the U.S. FDA granted Fast Track designation to the development of zelquistinel as an investigational new treatment for major depressive disorder. As of August 2019, the drug had completed a phase IIa clinical trial.

See also 
 List of investigational antidepressants
 Rapastinel
 Apimostinel

References

External links 
 AGN-241751 - AdisInsight

Antidepressants
Experimental drugs
NMDA receptor modulators